Kayadibi is a village in Antalya, Antalya Province, Turkey. As of 2000 it had a population of 83 people.

References

Villages in Antalya District